Elcomb is an unincorporated community and coal town in Harlan County, Kentucky, United States. The Elcomb Post Office was active from 1918 to 1935.

References

Unincorporated communities in Harlan County, Kentucky
Unincorporated communities in Kentucky
Coal towns in Kentucky